William Skocpol is a physicist at Boston University and an Elected Fellow of the American Physical Society.

References

Living people
Boston University faculty
21st-century American physicists
Fellows of the American Physical Society
Year of birth missing (living people)
Place of birth missing (living people)